North Point is a mixed-use urban area on the north of Hong Kong Island.

North Point may also refer to:

Places

United States
 Carnegie Camp North Point, a camp in New York
 North Point, former name of Cohasset, California
 North Point, Maryland
 North Point, St. Louis, Missouri
 North Point Community Church, a megachurch located in Alpharetta, Georgia
 North Point Park (Van Buren County, Michigan), a conservation area in Michigan
 North Point (Cambridge, Massachusetts), the redevelopment of old rail yard land in East Cambridge, Massachusetts
 North Point High School, in Waldorf, Maryland
 North Point Light, a lighthouse in Lake Park, Milwaukee, Wisconsin
 North Point Mall, a super-regional shopping mall in Alpharetta, Georgia
 North Point Office Building and Tower, a complex consisting of a skyscraper and an office building in Cleveland, Ohio

Other places
 North Point, Newfoundland and Labrador, Canada
 North Point, Queensland, a point on Moreton Island, Queensland, Australia
 North Point, Signy Island, a point on Signy Island, South Orkney Islands, Antarctica
 St. Joseph's School, Darjeeling (commonly called North Point), in West Bengal, India

Other uses
 "North Point" (1987), a song from Mike Oldfield's album Islands
 "North Point" (1974), an instrumental on BBC Radio 1971-1974 and Floating World Live by Soft Machine
 NP (novel) (short for "North Point"), a 1990 novel by Banana Yoshimoto
 Battle of North Point, a part of the Battle of Baltimore during the War of 1812
 North Point Press, an imprint of Farrar, Straus and Giroux

See also
 
 Northpoint (disambiguation)